Bosnia and Herzegovina participated in the Eurovision Song Contest 1994 in Dublin, Ireland. Alma and Dejan represented Bosnia and Herzegovina with the song "Ostani kraj mene".

Before Eurovision

BH Eurosong 1994 
The final was held at the Bosnian TV Studios in Sarajevo on 26 February 1994, hosted by Ismeta Krvavac. Alma and Dejan recorded videoclips of all 8 songs, but only about 1 minute of each song was shown. An expert jury chose the winner, and only the name of the winning song was announced.

At Eurovision
Alma & Dejan performed 18th on the night of the contest, following Norway and preceding Greece. At the close of voting the duo received 39 points, placing 15th of the 25 competing countries. The Bosnian jury awarded its 12 points to Malta.

Big applause rang throughout the hall before the performance of the duo, causing Dejan to miss first line of the song.

Voting

References

1994
Countries in the Eurovision Song Contest 1994
Eurovision